Joseph-Octave Arsenault (August 5, 1828 – December 14, 1897) was a Canadian politician who was the first Acadian from Prince Edward Island to be named to the Senate of Canada.

Born in Cascumpec, Prince Edward Island, the son of Mélème Arsenault and Bibienne Poirier, he was a teacher, and later the owner of several businesses, including two general stores and a fish company. In 1867, he was elected to the Legislative Assembly of Prince Edward Island for the riding of 3rd Prince and served for 28 years. In 1895, he was appointed to the Senate representing the senatorial division of Prince Edward Island. He served until his death in Abram-Village in 1897.

In 1861, he married Gertrude Gaudet. They had nine children. His son Aubin-Edmond Arsenault was Premier of Prince Edward Island and his son Joseph-Félix Arsenault served in the provincial assembly.

Arsenault played an important role in organizing the first two Acadian national conventions which were held in Memramcook, New Brunswick in 1881 and Miscouche, Prince Edward Island in 1884.

External links
Biography at the Dictionary of Canadian Biography Online
 

1828 births
1897 deaths
People from Prince County, Prince Edward Island
Acadian people
Canadian senators from Prince Edward Island
Conservative Party of Canada (1867–1942) senators
Progressive Conservative Party of Prince Edward Island MLAs